The men's Greco-Roman light heavyweight was a Greco-Roman wrestling event held as part of the Wrestling at the 1956 Summer Olympics programme. It was the tenth appearance of the event. Light heavyweight was the second-heaviest category, including wrestlers weighing up to 87 kilograms.

Competition format

This Greco-Roman wrestling competition continued to use the "bad points" elimination system introduced at the 1928 Summer Olympics for Greco-Roman and at the 1932 Summer Olympics for freestyle wrestling, as modified in 1952 (adding medal rounds and making all losses worth 3 points—from 1936 to 1948 losses by split decision only cost 2). Each round featured all wrestlers pairing off and wrestling one bout (with one wrestler having a bye if there were an odd number). The loser received 3 points. The winner received 1 point if the win was by decision and 0 points if the win was by fall. At the end of each round, any wrestler with at least 5 points was eliminated. This elimination continued until the medal rounds, which began when 3 wrestlers remained. These 3 wrestlers each faced each other in a round-robin medal round (with earlier results counting, if any had wrestled another before); record within the medal round determined medals, with bad points breaking ties.

Results
Source: Official results

Round 1

 Bouts

 Points

Round 2

Atan withdrew due to injury after his bout.

 Bouts

 Points

Round 3

 Bouts

 Points

Round 4

 Bouts

 Points

Medal rounds

Nikolayev's victories over Sirakov in round 1 and over Nilsson in round 4 counted for the medal round, giving him the gold medal at 2–0 against the other medalists. Sirakov defeated Nilsson in a de facto silver medal bout.

 Bouts

 Points

References

Wrestling at the 1956 Summer Olympics